Parexocoetus is a genus of flying fishes. They are found in the tropical and subtropical western Atlantic and Indo-Pacific Oceans. It is the only genus in the subfamily Parexocoetinae which is unique among the flying fishes in having a jaw which is very protrusible and having a joint situated between the cranium and the shoulder girdle which allows the head to be more maneuverable than in other lineages of this family.

Species
Three recognized species are in this genus:
 Parexocoetus brachypterus (J. Richardson, 1846) (sailfin flyingfish)
 Parexocoetus hillianus (P. H. Gosse, 1851)
 Parexocoetus mento (Valenciennes, 1847) (African sailfin flyingfish)

References

 
Exocoetidae